Ismail Ba (born 22 May 1974) is a Senegalese former football midfielder. He played for Greek clubs Skoda Xanthi and Aris Thessaloniki F.C. and Cypriot clubs AEK Larnaca, AC Omonia, AEP Paphos and Atromitos Yeroskipou.

References
 

1974 births
Living people
Association football midfielders
Senegalese footballers
Senegal international footballers
Senegalese expatriate footballers
Super League Greece players
Cypriot First Division players
Cypriot Second Division players
Aris Thessaloniki F.C. players
Xanthi F.C. players
AC Omonia players
AEK Larnaca FC players
AEP Paphos FC players
Atromitos Yeroskipou players
Expatriate footballers in Greece
Expatriate footballers in Cyprus